St Frideswide's Church is a Church of England church on the south side of the Botley Road in New Osney, west Oxford, England. The church is in a district originally part of the parish of St Thomas the Martyr.

History
The church is dedicated to the patroness of Oxford, St Frideswide. It was designed by the 19th-century Gothic Revival architect Samuel Sanders Teulon of Westminster, London and built by the local firm of Honour & Castle. The foundation stone was laid in 1870 and the church was consecrated on 10 April 1872 by John Mackarness, the Bishop of Oxford. It was originally intended for the church tower to have a spire.

In the nave is the "Alice Door", carved by Alice Liddell, a daughter of Henry Liddell, the Dean of Christ Church, Oxford, made famous through Lewis Carroll's Alice's Adventures in Wonderland.

Immediately to the west is Osney Ditch. The church was the setting of a Morse detective story, Service of All the Dead by Colin Dexter.

Vicars of St Frideswide's
 1872-96 George Lynch Kemp
 1896-1905 Augustus Jameson Miller
 1905-14 William Alfred Spence
 1914-22 George Herbert Tremenheere
 1922-33 Charles Overy
 1933-76 Arnold Mallinson

Present day
St Frideswide's stands in the Anglo-Catholic tradition of the Church of England.

Gallery

See also
 Priory of St Frideswide, Oxford
 St Thomas the Martyr's Church, Oxford

References

1872 establishments in England
Churches completed in 1872
Church of England church buildings in Oxford
English Gothic architecture in Oxfordshire
Anglo-Catholic church buildings in Oxfordshire